Ranj Pillai (born January 1974) is a Canadian politician, who has been the tenth premier of Yukon since January 14, 2023 and leader of the Yukon Liberal Party since January 9, 2023. He represents the electoral district of Porter Creek South in the Legislative Assembly of Yukon, to which he was first elected in the 2016 election.

Early life 
Ranj was born in Nova Scotia. He grew up in Brook Village and Inverness before moving to Antigonish to complete his high school diploma. His father, Gopi (N.G.) Pillai, is a retired doctor in Inverness and his mother, Johnena Lee, is a retired nurse.

Career 
Pillai sat as a Whitehorse City Councillor from 2009 to 2012. While on council he helped bring Scotiabank Hockey Day in Canada to Whitehorse and was awarded the 2011 Yukon Tourism Champion Award for his efforts.

On December 3, 2016, Pillai was sworn into the Cabinet of Premier Sandy Silver as Deputy Premier and Minister of Energy, Mines and Resources, and Economic Development. He is also the Minister responsible for Yukon Development Corporation and the Yukon Energy Corporation.

Pillai was also the executive director of the Champagne and Aishihik First Nations, and has held senior roles with Northern Vision Development and Yukon College.

On November 25, 2022, Pillai announced his candidacy for leader of the Yukon Liberal Party. He was acclaimed party leader in January 2023 because there were no other candidates in the race, thus becoming the premier–designate. He is the second Indo-Canadian to become premier of a province or territory, after Ujjal Dosanjh in British Columbia. He was sworn in as premier on January 14.

Personal life 
Pillai is married and has two children.

Electoral record

Yukon general election, 2016

|-

| style="width: 130px" |Liberal
|Ranj Pillai
|align="right"|337
|align="right"|46.6%
|align="right"| +6.0%

|NDP
|Shirley Chua-Tan
|align="right"|102
|align="right"|14.1%
|align="right"| -2.4%
|- bgcolor="white"
!align="left" colspan=3|Total
!align="right"|724
!align="right"|100.0%
!align="right"| –

Whitehorse municipal election, 2009

References

Yukon Liberal Party MLAs
Living people
Politicians from Whitehorse
21st-century Canadian politicians
Deputy premiers of Yukon
Members of the Executive Council of Yukon
Canadian politicians of Indian descent
Year of birth missing (living people)
Yukon Liberal Party leaders
Premiers of Yukon